Hawcreek Township is one of twelve townships in Bartholomew County, Indiana, United States. As of the 2010 census, its population was 3,905 and it contained 1,537 housing units.

Geography

Cities, towns, villages
 Hartsville
 Hope

Unincorporated towns
 Old Saint Louis
 Rugby
(This list is based on USGS data and may include former settlements.)

Adjacent townships
 Noble Township, Shelby County (northeast)
 Clay Township, Decatur County (east)
 Jackson Township, Decatur County (southeast)
 Clifty Township (south)
 Clay Township (southwest)
 Flat Rock Township (west)
 Washington Township, Shelby County (northwest)

Cemeteries
The township contains these seven cemeteries: Fletcher, Galbraith, Hartsville College, Moravian, Old Saint Louis, Sidener and Simmons.

Major highways
  Indiana State Road 9
  Indiana State Road 46

Lakes
 Schaefer Lake

School districts
 Flat Rock-Hawcreek School Corporation

Political districts
 Indiana's 6th congressional district
 State House District 57
 State Senate District 41

References
 United States Census Bureau 2007 TIGER/Line Shapefiles
 United States Board on Geographic Names (GNIS)
 United States National Atlas

External links
 Indiana Township Association
 United Township Association of Indiana

Townships in Bartholomew County, Indiana
Townships in Indiana